Louisa Rolfe  (born November 1969) is a senior British police officer. She currently serves as Assistant Commissioner for Met Operations in the Metropolitan Police, having been Deputy Chief Constable of West Midlands Police from 2016 - 2020.

Life
She began her police career with Avon and Somerset Police, with which she spent 25 years, becoming its Head of CID developing specialist units in Organised Crime and Counter Terrorism Intelligence for south-west England along with multi-service teams for Crime Investigation, roads policing, dogs and firearms. She moved to West Midlands Police in December 2016 on her appointment as its Deputy Chief Constable. There she has led on diversity and domestic abuse, becoming lead on the latter for the National Police Chiefs Council. On 8 April 2020 it was announced that she would move to the Metropolitan Police Service, becoming Assistant Commissioner for Met Operations, assuming the post by August that year. In late September 2022 it was announced that she would move to Frontline Policing and be succeeded in Met Operations by Matt Twist.

Honours
Rolfe was appointed an Officer of the Order of the British Empire in the 2019 New Year Honours for services to policing. She is currently a trustee of charity Police Now.

References

Living people
1969 births
West Midlands Police chief officers
Assistant Commissioners of Police of the Metropolis
Officers of the Order of the British Empire
Women Metropolitan Police officers